Ferdinand Opitz (24 January 1885 – 8 May 1960) was an Austrian sculptor. His work was part of the art competitions at the 1928 Summer Olympics, the 1936 Summer Olympics, and the 1948 Summer Olympics.

References

Bibliography
 Dana Stehlíková: "Josef Opitz v Národním muzeu 1941 - 1945", in: Josef Opitz a umění na Chomutovsku a Kadaňsku 1350–1590. Sborník z mezinárodní konference pořádané ku příležitosti otevření expozice Všemu světu na útěchu — sochařství a malířství na Chomutovsku a Kadaňsku 1350–1590, eds. Renáta Gubíková — Markéta Prontekerová, pp. 54–85
 Jiří Kotalík, Almanach Akademie výtvarných umění v Praze, ke 180. výročí založení (1799-1979), Praha 1979, p. 95
 Ulrich Thieme - Felix Becker, Allgemeines Lexikon der bildenden Künstler, ed. Hans Vollmer, Leipzig b.d., Band 26, p. 28

1885 births
1960 deaths
20th-century Austrian sculptors
Austrian male sculptors
Olympic competitors in art competitions
Artists from Prague
20th-century Austrian male artists